Little Indian Creek Wildlife Management Area is located on  southwest of Westover in Monongalia County, West Virginia. The wildlife management area is centered on reclaimed former coal mine land along Little Indian Creek, a tributary of the Monongahela River.

Little Indian Creek WMA was purchased at a cost of $388,500 in late 2006.  Governor Joe Manchin dedicated the area  on 2005-06-27.

See also
Animal conservation
Fishing
Hunting
List of West Virginia wildlife management areas

References

External links
West Virginia DNR District 1 Wildlife Management Areas
West Virginia Hunting Regulations
West Virginia Fishing Regulations

Wildlife management areas of West Virginia
Protected areas of Monongalia County, West Virginia
IUCN Category V